Hebecarpa rectipilis, synonym Polygala rectipilis, common name New Mexico milkwort, is a plant native to one county in New Mexico and to northeast Mexico. The type specimen was collected near the Town of Hillsboro in Sierra County, at an elevation of 1065 m (3550 feet).

Hebecarpa rectipilis is herbaceous and up to 30 cm (12 inches) tall. It has oblong to ovate leaves narrowing to a point at the tip. Flowers are borne in terminal racemes of as many as 20 flowers. Flowers are purple, up to 6 mm (0.24 inches) long.

References

Polygalaceae
Flora of New Mexico
Flora of Northeastern Mexico